"Pimpernel" Smith (released in the USA as Mister V) is a 1941 British anti-Nazi thriller, produced and directed by its star Leslie Howard, which updates his role in The Scarlet Pimpernel (1934) from Revolutionary France to pre-Second World War Europe. The British Film Yearbook for 1945 described his work as "one of the most valuable facets of British propaganda".

The film helped to inspire the Swedish diplomat Raoul Wallenberg to lead a real-life rescue operation in Budapest that saved tens of thousands of Hungarian Jews from Nazi concentration camps during the last months of the Second World War.

Plot
In the spring of 1939, months before the outbreak of the war, eccentric Cambridge archaeologist Horatio Smith takes a group of British and American archaeology students to Nazi Germany to help in his excavations. His research is supported by the Nazis, since he professes to be looking for evidence of the Aryan origins of German civilisation.

However, he has a secret agenda: to free inmates of the concentration camps. During one such daring rescue, he hides disguised as a scarecrow in a field and is inadvertently shot in the arm by a German soldier idly engaging in a bit of target practice. Wounded, he still manages to free a celebrated pianist from a work gang. Later, his students guess his secret when they notice his injury and connect it to a newspaper story about the wounding of the latter-day Scarlet Pimpernel. They enthusiastically volunteer to assist him.

German Gestapo General von Graum is determined to find out the identity of the "Pimpernel" and eliminate him. Von Graum forces Ludmilla Koslowski to help him by threatening the life of her father, a leading Polish democrat held prisoner by the Nazis. When Smith finds out, he promises her he will free Koslowski.

Smith and his students, masquerading as American journalists, visit the camp in which Koslowski is being held. They overpower their escort, put on their uniforms, and leave with Koslowski and some other inmates. By now, von Graum is sure Smith is the man he is after, so he stops the train transporting the professor and various packing crates out of the country. However, when he has the crates opened, he is disappointed to find only ancient artefacts from Smith's excavations.

Von Graum still has Ludmilla, so Smith comes back for her. The general catches the couple at a border crossing. Smith tells Graum that the artefacts he has discovered disprove Nazi claims about the Aryan origins of the Germans. He predicts the Nazis will destroy themselves. In the end, Smith uses a distraction to escape into the fog, but promises to come back.

Cast

Leslie Howard as Professor Horatio Smith
Francis Sullivan as General von Graum
Mary Morris as Ludmilla Koslowski
Hugh McDermott as David Maxwell
Raymond Huntley as Marx
Manning Whiley as Bertie Gregson
Peter Gawthorne as Sidimir Koslowski
Allan Jeayes as Dr. Beckendorf
Dennis Arundell as Hoffman
Joan Kemp-Welch as School-teacher
Philip Friend as Spencer
 Laurence Kitchin as Clarence Elstead
David Tomlinson as Steve
 Basil Appleby as Jock MacIntyre
Percy Walsh as Dvorak
Roland Pertwee as Embassy Official Sir George Smith
A. E. Matthews as Earl of Meadowbrook
Aubrey Mallalieu as Dean
Ben Williams as Graubitz
Ernest Butcher as Weber
Arthur Hambling as Jordan
 Mary Brown as Girl Student
 W. Phillips as Innkeeper
 Ilse Bard as Gretchen
 Ernest Verne as German Officer
 George Street as Schmidt
 Hector Abbas as Karl Meyer
 Neal Arden as Second Prisoner
 Richard George as Prison Guard
 Roddy Hughes as Zigor
 Hwfa (Hugh) Pryce as Wagner
 Oriel Ross as Lady Willoughby
 Brian (Bryan) Herbert as Jaromir
 Suzanne Claire (aka Violette Cunnington) as Salesgirl
 Charles Paton as Steinhof
 Michael Rennie as Guard Captain (uncredited)
 Ronald Howard Minor role (uncredited)

Production
Leslie Howard had been aware of the Nazis in Europe and had developed a film treatment in 1938 based on the rescue of an Austrian anti-Nazi leader. The A. G. Macdonell story of "Pimpernel" Smith took the novel The Scarlet Pimpernel by Baroness Emmuska Orczy into modern times. Having played the leading role in the filmThe Scarlet Pimpernel (1934), Howard took on the updated project as the first film he directed and co-produced. Production on "Pimpernel" Smith began in early 1941.

Reception
Released in the United States as Mister V, the film review in The New York Times noted: "It is all absurd derring-do, of course, and it follows a routine pattern. It lacks the headlong course of the top-notch British thrillers. But "Mister V" becomes a tense excursion because of Mr. Howard's casual direction, and even more because of the consummate ease and the quiet irony of his performance."

During the Second World War, films shown at Chequers were the only recreational activity available to Winston Churchill, who felt that "the cinema is a wonderful form of entertainment, and takes the mind away from other things." "Pimpernel" Smith was the film which he chose to be shown in the wardroom of the battleship HMS Prince of Wales on 9 August 1941 to share with the ship's officers, as he travelled across the Atlantic for a secret conference with US President Franklin D. Roosevelt at Argentia in Newfoundland.

Box office
According to Kinematograph Weekly it was the third most popular film of 1941 in Britain, after 49th Parallel and The Great Dictator.

Inspiration for Raoul Wallenberg
When "Pimpernel" Smith reached Sweden in November 1943, the Swedish Film Censorship Board decided to ban it from public viewing, as it was feared that such a critical portrayal of Nazi Germany could harm Sweden's relationship with Germany and thus jeopardise the country's neutrality in the Second World War. Raoul Wallenberg did, however, manage to see it at a private screening at the British Embassy in Stockholm, together with his half-sister, Nina Lagergren.

She later recalled that on their way home after the screening, "he told me this was the kind of thing he would like to do." Since 1941, Wallenberg had made frequent trips to Hungary, and knew how oppressed the Hungarian Jews were. He travelled as a representative and later joint owner of an export-import company that was trading with central Europe and was owned by a Hungarian Jew.

Following the mass deportations that had started in April 1944, Wallenberg was sent to Budapest in August 1944, as First Secretary to the Swedish legation, assigned under secret agreement between the US and Swedish governments to organise a rescue programme for the Jews. By issuing fake "protective passports" which identified the bearers as Swedish, he and others working with him managed to rescue tens of thousands from being sent to German death camps. He rented 32 buildings and declared them to be Swedish territory; eventually, almost 10,000 people were sheltered there.

In May 1945, "Pimpernel" Smith was released in Sweden without any age restrictions.

Aftermath
This film may have been one of the reasons why Howard was killed in 1943 when the Dutch airliner he was travelling in was shot down by the Luftwaffe.

See also
 List of films in the public domain in the United States

References

Notes

Citations

Bibliography

 Howard, Ronald. In Search of My Father: A Portrait of Leslie Howard. London: St. Martin's Press, 1984. .
 Lavery, Brian. Churchill Goes to War: Winston's Wartime Journeys. London: Conway Publishing, 2007. .
 Linnéa, Sharon. Raoul Wallenberg: The Man Who Stopped Death. Philadelphia, Pennsylvania: Jewish Publication Society of America, 1993. .
 Noble, Peter (ed.) British Film Yearbook for 1945. London: Skelton Robinson, 1945.
 Rohwer, Jürgen. Chronology of the War at Sea 1939–1945: The Naval History of World War Two (Third Revised ed.). Annapolis, Maryland: Naval Institute Press, 2005. .

External links
 'Pimpernel' Smith (1941) at screenonline.org.uk
 Pimpernel Smith stills from BlakeneyManor.com
 
 

"Pimpernel" Smith (1941) review at The Objective Standard

1941 films
British black-and-white films
British World War II propaganda films
Scarlet Pimpernel films
Films directed by Leslie Howard
Films produced by Leslie Howard
1941 adventure films
Films set in Germany
Films set in 1939
Films with screenplays by Anatole de Grunwald
Films with screenplays by Ian Dalrymple
Films based on works by Emma Orczy
British adventure films
1941 war films